Myszadła  is a village in the administrative district of Gmina Jadów, within Wołomin County, Masovian Voivodeship, in east-central Poland.

Like the rest of Poland, Myszadła is located in the Central European Time time zone region with a UTC offset of 1 hour.

The village has a humid continental climate (Dfb) according to the Köppen climate classification and the town is on the Eurasian Plate in Europe.

Nearby settlements include:

 Podbale (1 km)
 Podmyszadła (1 km)
 Wójty (2 km)
 Sekłak (2 km)
 Kupce (3 km)
 Jadów (3 km)
 Karczewizna (3 km)
 Nowy Świętochów (3 km)
 Nowy Jadów (4 km)
 Barchów (4 km)
 Łochów (4 km)
 Strachówka (4 km)
 Rowiska (4 km)
 Urle (4 km)
 Twarogi (4 km)
 Trawy (5 km)
 Zofinin (5 km)
 Wólka Paplińska (5 km)
 Oble (5 km)
 Łopianka (5 km)
 Jasiorówka (5 km)
 Wujówka (5 km)
 Rabiany (5 km)
 Gwizdały (6 km)

References

Villages in Wołomin County